Ibrahim ibn Jaʽfar al-Mutawakkil (died 866), better known by his laqab al-Mu'ayyad (was an Abbasid prince, the third son of the Abbasid caliph al-Mutawakkil, and brother of al-Muntasir and al-Mu'tazz, who both would eventually become caliphs as well.

Life
Al-Mu'ayyad was the son of Al-Mutawakkil and his concubine, Ishaq. She was an Andulasian, and was one of his favorites. She was the mother of his sons Ibrahim al-Mu'ayyad and Abu Ahmad (the future al-Muwaffaq).

The caliph al-Mutawakkil had created a plan of succession that would allow his sons to inherit the caliphate after his death; he would be succeeded first by his eldest son, al-Muntasir, then by al-Mu'tazz and third by al-Mu'ayyad.

In 860, al-Mutawakkil had named his three sons heirs and seemed to favour al-Muntasir. However, this appeared to change and al-Muntasir feared his father was going to move against him. With the implicit support of the Turkic faction of the army, he ordered the assassination of al-Mutawakkil which was carried out by a Turkic soldier on December 11, 861.

The Turkish party then prevailed on al-Muntasir to remove his brothers from the succession, fearing revenge for the murder of their father. In their place, he was to appoint his son as heir-apparent. On April 27, 862 both brothers, al-Mu'ayyad and al-Mu'tazz, wrote a statement of abdication.

Al-Muntasir's reign lasted for half a year and ended with his death of unknown causes on 862. After the death of al-Muntasir, the Turkish chiefs assembled in a council to select his successor. They did not want to elect al-Mu'ayyad or any of the brothers; so they elected al-Musta'in, another grandson of al-Mu'tasim.

In 866, al-Musta'in was deposed and al-Mu'tazz came into power. Immediately upon becoming the new Caliph, al-Mu'tazz had the former Caliph al-Musta'in executed. The Turkish soldiery, after a brawl with the Maghariba troops, now turned their support to al-Mu'ayyad. Enraged by this predicament, the jealous Caliph had his brother, al-Mu'ayyad, being next heir to the throne, imprisoned along with another brother, Abu Ahmad, who had bravely led the troops in the late struggle on his side.

The Turks attempted his release, but al-Mu'tazz, the more alarmed, resolved on his death. He was smothered in a downy robe (or, as others say, frozen in a bed of ice); and the body was then exposed before the Court, as if, being without mark of violence, he had died a natural death, (a transparent subterfuge).

Claim of conversion to Christianity
This period saw the rise of a legend that an Abbasid prince had converted to Christianity under the influence of Theodore of Edessa, taken the name "John" and been killed for his apostasy; Alexander Vasiliev speculates that Muayyad may have been the convert. However, there is no Christian or Muslim record remotely associating Muayyad with Christianity or even, indeed, religious speculation. The motives for his murder seem to have been purely political; had he indeed converted, it would have given Mutazz an excuse to murder him for apostasy and been recorded.

See also
 Abdallah ibn al-Mu'tazz, nephew of al-Mu'ayyad.
 Al-Mufawwid, nephew of al-Mu'ayyad.

References

Further reading
 
 
 This text is adapted from William Muir's public domain work, The Caliphate: Its Rise, Decline, and Fall.

Sons of Abbasid caliphs
866 deaths
Murdered royalty
Year of birth unknown
9th-century executions by the Abbasid Caliphate
Heirs apparent who never acceded
9th-century Arabs